Carl Jacobson may refer to:
 Carl Ingold Jacobson, member of the Los Angeles City Council 
 Carl Jacobson (Minnesota politician), member of the Minnesota House of Representatives

See also
 Carl Jacobsen, Danish brewer, art collector and philanthropist
 Carl Jacobsen (politician), member of the Legislative Council of Papua and New Guinea
Carl Jakobsson, ice hockey player